Katrina Ray is a biologist and the chief editor of Nature Reviews Gastroenterology & Hepatology.

Education 
Ray has a bachelor's degree in microbiology from the University of Manchester and a PhD from Imperial College London where she studied Shigella flexneri.

Career 
Ray has worked at the Institut Pasteur, the Max Planck Institute for Infection Biology, and the Karolinska Institutet. She started working at Nature Reviews in 2010 and has worked in Nature Reviews Rheumatology and also Nature Reviews Gastroenterology & Hepatology where she became the chief editor in 2014.

Her research focusses on gastroenterology, infection, microbiota, neurogastroenterology, and viral hepatitis. She has advocated for people to consider gut microbes as a "human microbial organ."

Selected publications 

 Gut microbiota: married to our gut microbiota Nature Reviews Gastroenterology & Hepatology. 2012 Oct;9(10):555. doi: 10.1038/nrgastro.2012.165. PMID 23034427.
 Mapping the Cells in the Liver — Unchartered Subtypes and Heterogeneity, Nature Reviews Gastroenterology & Hepatology, July 30, 2019 doi 10.1038/s41575-019-0192-0

Personal life 
Ray lives in London, England.

References 

Living people
Alumni of the University of Manchester
Alumni of Imperial College London
20th-century British biologists
21st-century British biologists
Year of birth missing (living people)
Medical journal editors
Scientists from London
Max Planck Society people